Amdur may refer to:

 Amdur (Hasidic dynasty)
Indura, a village in Belarus
 Ellis Amdur (born 1952), American martial arts writer
 Mary Amdur (1921–1998), American public health researcher